Eric Petersen is an American actor. He is best known for his starring role as the titular character in the AMC dark comedy series Kevin Can F**k Himself (2021–present), and for playing the title character in the first US national tour of Shrek The Musical (2010).

Early life 
Petersen was born in Carol Stream, Illinois, a suburb of Chicago, and attended Glenbard North High School. He began acting during his freshman year of high school, after quitting the football team and subsequently missing soccer tryouts. His friend suggested that he audition for a role in the school production of The Hobbit, and the experience of playing that role inspired him to continue acting. Afterwards, he attended Bradley University, where he graduated in 2003 with a degree in theater.

Career 
After graduating from Bradley, Petersen took a role on the US national tour of The 25th Annual Putnam County Spelling Bee. He played William Barfee, one of the contestants in the eponymous spelling bee. He followed this effort with Shrek the Musical, serving at first as an understudy for the title character. Six months after the show opened in 2008, Petersen became part of the first round of replacements, and played Shrek on Broadway for another six months. When Shrek The Musical began its first national tour in 2010, Petersen once again served in the titular role.

Living in New York City at the time, Petersen made the transition into TV with a two-episode arc in the long-running soap opera As the World Turns. He played a "Bad Santa"-type criminal who held one of the main characters hostage as part of an attempted robbery. He followed this with a series of bit parts in shows such as The Big Bang Theory, Modern Family, and Law & Order: Special Victims Unit. In 2012, Petersen was cast as a series lead in Giant Baby, later renamed Kirstie, where he starred as Arlo, the long-lost son of Madison Banks (Kirstie Alley).

In 2021, Petersen starred opposite Annie Murphy as the titular character in the AMC dark comedy series Kevin Can F**k Himself. Petersen's character was meant to channel the stereotypical "sitcom husband", in the style of The King of Queens, The Honeymooners, and Family Guy, while revealing the dissatisfaction of Murphy's character, Allison.

Eric, and producer Danny Jordan, host two podcasts; Christmas Countdown Show and Parenting Countdown Podcast. Both podcasts share a similar format, in which the hosts countdown show related topics such as movies, TV, music, and special experiences.

Personal life 
Petersen married his wife, fellow musical theater actress Lisa Marie Morabito, in 2007. They have two children together:  Sophia and Miles.

Filmography

Film

Television

Theatre

Awards and nominations

References

External links 
 
 

Living people
21st-century American actors
People from Carol Stream, Illinois
American television actors
Bradley University alumni
Year of birth missing (living people)